The Byline Festival is a festival whose aim is to promote independent journalism and free speech. The festival was founded by Stephen Colegrave and Peter Jukes in 2017. Its tagline is "Dance, Discuss, Laugh and Change the World".

The festival is hosted by John Mitchinson, and Raphael Moran is the Festival film and photography producer and director.
Salena Godden is the festival's "poet laureate" and Hardeep Singh Kohli its "comedy ringleader".

History 
The first festival was held at Pippingford Park near Nutley, East Sussex, U.K. on 2–4 June 2017. More than 2,500 people were in attendance, including John Cleese, Andy Hamilton, Hardeep Singh Kohli, Jay Rosen and Martin Bell.

The 2018 Byline Festival was partnered by the Frontline Club and took place 24–27 August 2018 at Pippingford Park. Those present included Happy Graveyard Orchestra, Alexei Sayle, John Cleese, June Sarpong, Bonnie Greer, Martin Bell, Tom Watson MP, Baroness Warsi, Lord Adebowale, Damian Collins MP, Kate Mosse, A L Kennedy, Gary Lineker, Joanna Scanlan, Nick Davis, Salena Godden, Madeleina Kay. Other events included circus, theatre, drama, poetry and music, as well as children's activities.

Musical acts at the 2018 festival included Pussy Riot, Joey Base, Badly Drawn Boy, The Blow Monkeys, The Vapors, Tom Hingley from Inspiral Carpets, Rhoda Dakar, the Courtesans, Dramarama, Hows Harry, The Members, Sunstreets, Excursia and the Priscillas. The theatre section was headlined by FoolishPeople.

The Cambridge Analytica whistleblowers Chris Wylie, Shahmir Sanni and John Ford were present, along with Carole Cadawalladr.

The festival takes Place at Pippingford Park in the Ashdown Forest. In 2018 it had five main stages that were tents in the forest. These hosted 150 talk sessions and over 100 workshops. In the evening, tents provided entertainment including immersive theatre, rap battles and live art demonstrations. The festival fringe included Idler, BBC Virtual Reality, The Fourth Group, Overtake and Frontline Club.

The 2022 festival was relocated to Acklam Village in Notting Hill. On May 2nd 2022, the festival came under fire after a video was posted by a band named Tokyo Taboo in which the band's set was interrupted by the festival promoter and confiscated the drummer's drumsticks to stop them playing, the festival organisers and venue owner have since apologised to Tokyo Taboo citing noise complaints from neighbours as the reason for the set being cut short.

References

External links 
Official Website

Festivals in East Sussex
2017 in England
Citizen journalism
June 2017 events in the United Kingdom
Danehill, East Sussex